The National Institute for Smart Government (NISG) is a non-for profit company incorporated in 2002 by the Government of India and NASSCOM with its head office at Hyderabad, India.

See also
 MyGov

References

External links
Official site
Ministry of Electronics and Information Technology website
eGovernance Standards
Overview of ratings for all federal programs

Politics and technology
Non-profit organisations based in India
E-government in India